The NCAA Men's Division III Indoor Track and Field Championship is an annual collegiate indoor track and field competition for men organised by the National Collegiate Athletic Association. Athlete's individual performances earn points for their institution and the team with the most points receives the NCAA team title in track and field.

Events

Track events

Sprint events
60 meter dash 
200 meter dash
400 meter dash
Distance events
800 meter run
Mile run
3,000 meter run
5,000 meter run
Hurdle Events
60 meter high hurdles
Relay events
1,600 meter relay
Distance medley relay

Field events

Jumping events
High jump
Pole vault]
Long jump
Triple jump
Throwing events
Shot put
Weight throw
Multi-events
Heptathlon

Discontinued events

Sprint events
55 meter dash (1985–2011)
Hurdle Events
55 meter high hurdles(1985–2011)
1,500 meter run (1985–2004)
Multi-events
Pentathlon (2009–2011)

Results

Champions

Team titles
List updated through the 2023 Championships.

 Schools highlight in yellow have reclassified athletics from NCAA Division III.

See also
NCAA Men's Indoor Track and Field Championship (Division I, Division II)
NCAA Women's Indoor Track and Field Championship (Division I, Division II, Division III)
NCAA Men's Outdoor Track and Field Championship (Division I, Division II, Division III)
NCAA Women's Outdoor Track and Field Championship (Division I, Division II, Division III)
Pre-NCAA Outdoor Track and Field Champions

References

External links
NCAA Division III men's outdoor track and field

 Indoor
NCAA men Division III
Men's athletics competitions